Brigham is a civil parish in the borough of Allerdale in Cumbria, England.  It contains 16 listed buildings that are recorded in the National Heritage List for England.  Of these, one is listed at Grade I, the highest of the three grades, one is at Grade II*, the middle grade, and the others are at Grade II, the lowest grade.  The parish contains the village of Brigham and surrounding countryside.  The listed buildings include a church and a sundial in the churchyard, houses and associated structures, farmhouses and farm buildings, milestones, a bridge, a war memorial, and a cattle pound.


Key

Buildings

Notes and references

Notes

Citations

Sources

Lists of listed buildings in Cumbria